The Richard Doll Building (RDB) is a University of Oxford building on the Old Road Campus, in Headington, east Oxford, England. The building is named after the physician and epidemiologist Sir Richard Doll CH OBE FRS (1912–2005).

The building houses the Nuffield Department of Population Health and includes the National Perinatal Epidemiology Unit, Clinical Trial Service Unit, Epidemiological Studies Unit, Cancer Epidemiology Unit, Screening Unit, and the Office of the Regius Professor of Medicine.

The Richard Doll Building was designed by Nicholas Hare Architects in 2006. The building is 9,000m2 and won the RIBA South-East Award in 2007.

A plaque inside the building contains the following quotation by Richard Doll:

References

2006 establishments in England
Buildings and structures completed in 2006
Buildings and structures of the University of Oxford